Ingrid Julieth Vidal Isaza (born 22 April 1991) is a Colombian footballer who plays as a forward for CD Generaciones Palmiranas and the Colombia national team. 

She made her debut for Colombia against Peru on 17 November 2009. Born in Palmira, Valle del Cauca, she began her career in 2009 with Generaciones Palmiranas. In 2011, she moved to the United States to play for the Kansas Jayhawks college soccer team, but she has since returned to Generaciones Palmiranas.

She was part of the Colombian 2012 Olympic team.

References

1991 births
Living people
Women's association football forwards
Colombian women's footballers
Sportspeople from Valle del Cauca Department
People from Palmira, Valle del Cauca
Colombia women's international footballers
2011 FIFA Women's World Cup players
2015 FIFA Women's World Cup players
Olympic footballers of Colombia
Footballers at the 2012 Summer Olympics
Footballers at the 2016 Summer Olympics
Pan American Games competitors for Colombia
Footballers at the 2015 Pan American Games
Kansas Jayhawks women's soccer players
Colombian expatriate women's footballers
Colombian expatriate sportspeople in the United States
Expatriate women's soccer players in the United States
Pan American Games silver medalists for Colombia
Medalists at the 2015 Pan American Games
Pan American Games medalists in football
20th-century Colombian women
21st-century Colombian women